The A32 is the only road in Botswana to Sowa and Sua Pan Airport (also known as Sowa Airport).

References

Roads in Botswana